KSTL may refer to:

 KSTL (AM), a radio station (690 AM) licensed to St. Louis, Missouri, United States
 The East Timor Trade Union Confederation (Konfederasaun Sindicatu Timor Lorosa'e) 
 The ICAO code for St. Louis Lambert International Airport
 Standard Template Library for kernel-mode applications